Dr. Cabbie is a 2014 Canadian-Indian English-language romantic comedy film directed by Jean-François Pouliot and co-produced by Salman Khan. The film stars Kunal Nayyar, Vinay Virmani, and Adrianne Palicki. The story revolves around a newly arrived immigrant doctor in Canada who cannot get a job and is forced to become a taxi driver. He becomes a local hero when he converts his taxi into a mobile medical clinic. The film was released on DVD and Blu-ray from 23 December 2014.

Plot
Deepak Veer Chopra is an Indian doctor who immigrates to Canada in the hope of starting a new life, but bureaucracy confines him to live as a taxi driver. After delivering a baby in his cab, he starts treating other passengers and practising medicine illegally, even though he has a medical degree and he is certified. He also falls in love with Natalie Wilman, the woman whose baby he delivered and she uses her training as a (non-practising) lawyer to help him achieve his dreams. Natalie names her son Ganesh at Deepak's suggestion. The baby's father is revealed to be Colin, a playboy who is running for election. Evidence found by the Canadian police leads to Deepak being arrested for illegal distribution of drugs. Natalie agrees to give him legal advice. At the trial, his patients defend Deepak furiously. He is found not guilty of the crimes he committed by acting as a taxi driver doctor, but is charged for possessing and distribution of drugs. Natalie, who has fallen in love with Deepak, asks him to marry her. He refuses, then immediately proposes saying that he wants to marry her on his terms. The authorities now take into account Deepak's family members (who in this case consist of a wife and baby), and clear him of all charges and got 500 hours community service prescribing medicine without a license to avoid jail time and deportation. After the trial concludes, Colin is standing near the exit and responsible for Deepak arrest, drunk, and teases Natalie about marrying Deepak. Deepak hits Colin; Natalie asks Colin if he is okay, and then hits him again. Deepak proposes having their honeymoon in India and Natalie agrees, saying that she would love to see the Taj Mahal with him. Two years later, they are still married and Natalie is pregnant with Deepak's baby. Deepak is a full fledge license doctor in Toronto and working in the hospital.  Natalie requests to Deepak that this time she prefers to have the baby in the hospital rather than in the cab and may marry the taxi driver. Deepak shares as long as the taxi driver is a doctor!

Cast
 Vinay Virmani as Dr. Deepak Veer Chopra
 Adrianne Palicki as Natalie Wilman
 Kunal Nayyar as Tony
 Lillete Dubey as Nellie Chopra
 Ashu Kohli as Dr. Anil Chopra
 Mircea Monroe as Rani Sharma 
 Rizwan Manji as Vijay Sharma 
 Judah Katz as James Whilcher
 Isabel Kaif as Simone
 Chris Diamantopoulos as Colin
 Lilly Singh as Lily (cameo appearance)

Release

Critical reception
On release, the film received generally positive responses from critics. Culture plus Blog reviewed with 4 stars and stated:

Anokhi Media gave a positive review to the movie and stated: "the movie crafts a new breed of cinema that caters to a multicultural universal audience, definitely one to watch." Binzento blog gave the film 4.5 stars and stated, "recommend this film to those that are in the midst of going through troubling times in life, and need something to up-lift their spirits, and give them the encouragement and hope to over come the challenge."

Box office
The film was released in Canada on 19 September 2014 in 55 cinemas. It earned $350,452 on its opening day at the box office and became the second highest-grossing film in Canada. The film earned $702,000 over the weekend.

In the US, the film earned only $225,490.

Soundtrack

References

External links
 
 
 
 

2014 films
2014 romantic comedy films
English-language Canadian films
Films directed by Jean-François Pouliot
Films shot in Toronto
Films set in Toronto
Medical-themed films
Canadian romantic comedy films
Canadian satirical films
Films about taxis
Films produced by Salman Khan
2010s English-language films
2010s Canadian films